Nora Mill Dam is a log dam about one mile or 1.5 km south of Helen, Georgia on the Chattahoochee River.  The dam was built in 1824, and there is still a working grist mill at the site.  The historic Nora Mill Granary was established in 1876, and is operated a business open to the public, selling grits, cornmeal, and other products which it mills in front of customers (though much of it is covered for safety reasons).

References

DNora Mill
Dams in Georgia (U.S. state)
Buildings and structures in White County, Georgia